The women's relay competition of the Biathlon European Championships 2009 was held on March 4, 2009.

External links
 Results

Biathlon European Championships 2009
2009 in Russian women's sport